The 1990 Volvo Tennis Los Angeles was a men's tennis tournament played on outdoor hard courts at the Los Angeles Tennis Center in Los Angeles, California in the United States that was part of the World Series of the 1990 ATP Tour. It was the 64th edition of the tournament and was held from July 30 through August 5, 1990. First-seeded Stefan Edberg, who had been a runner-up in 1985, 1986 and 1987, won the singles title and earned $32,400 first-prize money.

Finals

Singles

 Stefan Edberg defeated  Michael Chang 7–6(7–4), 2–6, 7–6(7–3)
 It was Edberg's 4th singles title of the year and the 24th of his career.

Doubles

 Scott Davis /  David Pate defeated  Peter Lundgren /  Paul Wekesa 3–6, 6–1, 6–3

References

Volvo Tennis Los Angeles
Los Angeles Open (tennis)
Volvo Tennis Los Angeles
Volvo Tennis Los Angeles
Volvo Tennis Los Angeles
Volvo Tennis Los Angeles